Emilio Malchiodi (March 28, 1922 – November 21, 1997) was an Argentine athlete. He competed in the shot put and the discus event at the 1948 Summer Olympics. He came 5th at the 1951 Pan American Games in the discus.

References

1922 births
1997 deaths
Argentine male discus throwers
Argentine male shot putters
Olympic athletes of Argentina
Athletes (track and field) at the 1948 Summer Olympics
Pan American Games competitors for Argentina
Athletes (track and field) at the 1951 Pan American Games
20th-century Argentine people